The 1964 Brent Council election took place on 7 May 1964 to elect members of Brent London Borough Council in London, England. The whole council was up for election and the Labour party gained control of the council.

Background
These elections were the first to the newly formed borough. Previously elections had taken place in the Municipal Borough of Wembley and Municipal Borough of Willesden. These boroughs were joined to form the new London Borough of Brent by the London Government Act 1963.

A total of 157 candidates stood in the election for the 60 seats being contested across 26 wards. These included a full slate from the Labour party, while the Conservative and Liberal parties stood 50 and 31 respectively. Other candidates included 16 from the Communist party. There were 18 two-seat wards and 8 three-seat wards.

This election had aldermen as well as directly elected councillors.  Labour got all 10 aldermen. 

The Council was elected in 1964 as a "shadow authority" but did not start operations until 1 April 1965.

Election result
The results saw Labour gain the new council with a majority of 8 after winning 34 of the 60 seats. Overall turnout in the election was 36.1%. This turnout included 809 postal votes.

Ward results

References

1964
1964 London Borough council elections